Lianhua may refer to:

Lianhua County (莲花县), in Jiangxi, China
Lianhua Dam, in Heilongjiang, China
Lianhua Film Company (联华影业公司), a major Chinese film studio and production house in 1930s Shanghai
Lianhua Road Station (莲花路站), station on Shanghai Metro Line 1, China
Lianhua Peak (莲花山), the highest point in China's Anhui province, located in the Huangshan mountains
Lianhua Supermarket
Lianhua Town (disambiguation) (莲花镇), the name of a number of towns in China
Lianhua, Wenquan, Yingshan County, Huanggang, Hubei